Krivelj is a village in the municipality of Bor, Serbia. According to the 2002 census, the village has a population of 1316 people.

Notable people
Pjotr Alejnikova, movie actor from 1944 until his death, was born here on 12 July 1914. He died on 9 June 1965 in Moscow.

References

Populated places in Bor District
Bor, Serbia